Salarias patzneri, Patzner's blenny, is a species of combtooth blenny found in coral reefs in the western central Pacific ocean.  This species can reach a length of  TL. The specific name honours the Austrian ichthyologist Robert A. Patzner who worked on the genitalia of blennies and who shared specimens with Hans Bath.

References

patzneri
Taxa named by Hans Bath
Fish described in 1992